Alfred Hayes (18 April 1911 – 14 August 1985) was a British-born screenwriter, television writer, novelist, and poet, who worked in Italy and the United States. His well-known poem about "Joe Hill" ("I dreamed I saw Joe Hill last night") was set to music by Earl Robinson, and performed by Pete Seeger, Joan Baez and many other artists.

Life
Born in Whitechapel, London to a Jewish family that moved to the United States when he was three, Hayes graduated from New York's City College (now part of City University of New York), worked briefly as a newspaper reporter, and began writing fiction and poetry in the 1930s. During World War II he served in Europe in the U.S. Army Special Services (the "morale division"). Afterwards, he stayed in Rome and became a screenwriter of Italian neorealist films.

His experience in Allied-occupied Rome served as the basis for his first two novels. All Thy Conquests (1947) is an episodic novel that follows several Americans and Italians over the course of a day in September 1944. The novel uses as its historical backdrop the massacre of the Fosse Ardeatine and the botched trial of fascist Pietro Caruso that devolved into a lynching, shocking the entire world. His second novel, The Girl on the Via Flaminia (1949), revisits the setting of Allied-occupied Rome, but focuses on a single, failed romance between the American officer, Robert, and the Italian, Lisa, whom he pays to play his wife.

Hayes rewrote one of the episodes of All Thy Conquests as part of his work as a co-writer on Roberto Rossellini's Paisan (1946), which earned him an Academy Award nomination; he received another Academy Award nomination for Teresa (1951). He was an uncredited co-writer of Vittorio De Sica's neorealist film Bicycle Thieves (1948) for which he also wrote the English language subtitles. He adapted The Girl on the Via Flaminia into a Broadway play in 1953, and that same year it was adapted into a French-language film Un acte d'amour.

Among his U.S. filmwriting credits are The Lusty Men (1952, directed by Nicholas Ray) and the film adaptation of the Maxwell Anderson/Kurt Weill musical Lost in the Stars (1974). His credits as a television scriptwriter included scripts for American series Alfred Hitchcock Presents, The Twilight Zone, Nero Wolfe and Mannix.

Bibliography

Poetry
The Big Time (1944)
Welcome to the Castle (1950)
Just Before the Divorce (1968)

Novels
All Thy Conquests (1946)
Shadow of Heaven (1947)
The Girl on the Via Flaminia (1949)
In Love (1953)
My Face for the World to See (1958)
The End of Me (1968)
The Stockbroker, the Bitter Young Man, and the Beautiful Girl (1973)

Short stories
The Temptations of Don Volpi (1960)

External links

Sandra Brennan, Alfred Hayes on The New York Times' Allmovie site. Accessed on January 25, 2006.
Alfred Hayes Papers at the University of Southern California

References

1911 births
1985 deaths
People from Whitechapel
British emigrants to the United States
English Jews
English male screenwriters
English television writers
20th-century English novelists
20th-century English poets
British male television writers
20th-century English screenwriters
20th-century English male writers